Arondizuogu (Aro-ndizuogu) is a town inhabited by the Igbo subgroup, the Aro people in the Imo State of Nigeria. The Arondizuogu community is believed to have migrated from Arochukwu in the present Abia State, to their current settlements in across three local governments of Imo state, which include the Okigwe, Ideato North and Onuimo Local Governments, although there are others of Aro descent in other local governments, in Imo State.

 Aro-Orji in owerri north

Geographical location 
Arondizuogu is a group of sprawling communities with the largest area, located in the land obtained from Umualaoma town (formerly Isiokpu). Many believe that these lands were obtained through warfare and open massacre of people from Umualaoma.

Arondizuogu is situated in Imo State of Nigeria. Most of the wars were stopped by one powerful charismatic Patriarch of the host community ,(Isokpu) by the name Ezerioha Udensi of Obiokwara, Obinihu, Umualaoma(Isuokpu). Ezerioha has subsequently organised peaceful allocation or donation of lands, by different villages and towns close to Arondizuogu, after discovering that Arondizuogu people could not go back to Aro Chukwu.

Arondizuogu communities are spread out into three local government areas: Ideato North, Okigwe and Onuimo according to the various indigenous villages where the lands were obtained through similar means.

History 
Arondizuogu was founded by the use of force by Mazi Izuogu Mgbokpo and his brothers (Iheme) in the mid-14th century. Izuogu Mgbokpo was a 
charismatic slave merchant who came from Arochukwu to Awka in search of slaves. He was usually harbored by a friend from Umualaoma where he slept when going in search of slaves and with his goods (slaves). Some of the slaves of Izuogu maintained the name even after they were freed from captivity. Izuogu Mgbokpo has three children and three brothers. The children were Uche (Ndi Uche whose mother was from Isiekenesii), Awa (Ndiawa)and Amazu (Ndiamazu). While the brothers were Imoko (Ndi-imoko), Njoku (Ndi-Njoku) and Akame (Ndi-akaeme). Others are aborigines such as Ogbuonyeoma, Amankwu, Ekwuru  Iheme, himself, was his Chief Servant and he came from Isi-Akpu Nise, in Awka. Iheme and his master Izuogu used all the weapons at their disposal, including the slaves, juju, guns and other equipments for securing slaves which they sold to the European slave merchants, Arondizuogu people refer to themselves as "Izuogu na Iheme".

Early in the 19th century, Mazi Okoli Idozuka was an immigrant from Isi-Akpu Nise to Arondizuogu. As a great slave warrior, he expanded Arondizuogu's boundaries. He later changed his name to Okoro Idozuka, an Aro equivalent of his former name. He was a wealthy ruthless and almost conscienceless slave trader like Izuogu Mgbokpo but was also a great leader. Nwankwo Okoro was the first son of Okoro Idozuka. At the age of 21 he joined his father in the slave trade. * By collecting slaves and war-captives he was able to build a very large family. When the British came, they made him a Warrant Chief because they believed he could subdue anybody and collect the taxes they desperately needed form them. Until this day, Arondizuogu is the biggest former Aro colony and a land of immigrants settling  mainly on the rich land.

Historical sites
Some Places of Interest in Arondizuogu include Mazi Mbonu Ojike Cottage (Village home of Nigeria's late "Boycott king"), Mazi Mbonu Ojike at Ndiakeme Uno; Uno Ogologo (a safe house built in 1887 for hiding children during the slave trade era); The Stone Palace (a storey building cast in stone erected by late Chief Green Mbadiwe, West Africa's first millionaire for his father, Umualaoma Nkwo Ochie (old Nkwo).

Mbadiwe Odum at Ndianiche Uno; Ngeze (legendary stream at Ndiakeme Uno); Ogbuti Ezumezu (exotic visitor's chamber of Ikeji music maestro Pericoma Okoye at Ndiogbuonyeoma Ofe Imo); LN Motel Plaza, Home Diamond Hotel (luxury hospitality rendezvous at Ndiawa); National High School, Arondizuogu (pioneer model school built by Mazi Nwosu Elele Igwiloh with the help of community effort  and commissioned in 1951 at Ndiakeme Uno); Iheme Memorial Secondary School (second model school built by community effort and commissioned 1951 at Ndianiche Uno); Palace of The People (legendary country home of grandiloquent Nigerian politician, Dr. K.O. Mbadiwe at Ndianiche Uno commissioned by late Prime minister, Alhaji Tafawa Balewa in 1965); Upiti (expansive rice fields at Akeme Ohiauchu); Obi Omenuko, homestead of Igwegbe Odum (Omenuko), the hero of Pita Nwana's book; Ngene Okwe (natural spring at Ndiawa). Obi Ezerioha in Obiokwara, Obinihu (Agbualla) Umualaoma where the agreement for

Ndi izuogu lives in many local government areas in Imo State. Although they have almost the same dialect with the group of Igbos in Anambra state, apart from Ndi Uche (descendants of the first son of Izuogu) that still retain a slightly different language as they live at the border to protect other members of the clan. Their language is slightly affected by their neighbours. It is remarkable that Arondizuogu is the only community that inhabits three local government areas apart from Mbaise. The local Government they inhabit include Okigwe, Ideato North and Onuimo.

Arondizuogu is made up of 20 villages.

Izuogu Community and their locations

 Uche –    a) Ochie Uno b) Umuduru (near Aniche Uwakonye) c) Ikpatu in Aro-Okigwe, (Ofe Imo) d) Aro Onu Imo, e)Ikpa Alike, f)Okporo Amiri, g)Ala Ocha, h)Amaorji (all in Aro Amuro), i)Umunna in Aro-Okigwe, j)Ala Ohuru near  Umualaoma (formerly known as Oree) Okigwe, k)Ikpaebi Aro Umulolo
 Awa –     a) Ochie Uno b) Aro Umulolo c) Aro-Okigwe
 Njoku –  a) Ochie Uno b) Aro Amuro c) Ikpa Akanu (Aro-Okigwe), Aro Ogii (Boundary)
 Imoko  – a) Ochie Uno b) Aro-Okigwe
 Amazu – a) Ochie Uno b) Ikpa Akaputa c) Ikpa Ocha d) Ndi Okoli Igbo e) Aro Amuro f) Ikpa Akwu
 Ejezie   – a) Ochie Uno
 Adimoha – a) Ochie Uno
 Anyake  –  a) Ochie Uno
 Uwaonu  –  a) Aro Okigwe
 Ucheagwu  – a) Aro Umulolo
 Ndubisi  – a) Aro Umulolo
 Ekwulu

Iheme Community and their locations

 Aniche  – a) Ochie Uno b) Obinetiti c) Uwakonye d) Ndi be Ezeana e) Ndi be Ogbuda, f) Ikpenyi g) Aro-Okigwe
 Onuoha  – a) Ochie Uno b) Ofe Imo c) Aro Umulolo
 Eze  –  a) Ochie Uno b) Aro Umulolo c) Aro Ofe Imo d) Umuedi
 Okonkwo  –  a) Ochie Uno b) Ofe Imo
 Ogbuonyeoma  a) Ochie Uno b) Ndi be Uche c) Umudike d) Okwu Achara e) Umuedi f) Umu Orji
 Akeme –  a) Ochie Uno b) Ohia Uchu c) Ikpa Okoli d) Nduka e) Ugwaku
 Ukwu – a) Ochie Uno b) Ofe Imo
 Akunwanta –  a) Ochie Uno b) Nkwo Fada c) Idozuka (Aro Umulolo)

Festivals

Arondizuogu day

Instituted in 1948, ‘Arondizuogu Day’ which is an annual end-of year convention of people of Arondizuogu descent resident in Nigeria and the Diaspora. It is a day set aside to celebrate achievements, review challenges, and generally keep the flag of patriotism flying in the community. For the culture – loving people of Arondizuogu, the day is a special annual homecoming which they celebrate with much aplomb comparable only to their popular Ikeji Festival which is touted to be “the greatest carnival of masks and masquerades in Africa”.

Ikeji 

Ikeji cultural festival of Arondizuogu in Imo State is a popular festival that brings the Igbo speaking community around the world together. Its origin dates back to over five centuries and it is acclaimed as the biggest pan-Igbo cultural community festival with strong heritage, international recognition and is witnessed by thousands of people on a yearly basis.
It is arguably the biggest cultural festival in Igboland. In contemporary times, each passing year has witnessed an increase in grandeur, display, dance, sophistication and an all-inclusive participation of all Arondizuogu people and friends. The festival is marked with colourful display of different masquerades such as Ogionu, Mgbadike, Nwaaburuja and Ozoebune; prestigiously parading across the market square to the admiration of the public. The essence of the festival, which ranks among the best surviving traditional ceremonies of the Arondizuogu people, is to celebrate the harvest of the first yams. It serves to unify and foster ties among Aro people who are spread across the entire Igbo speaking states and part of Cross River state. It appeals to the entire Igbo speaking peoples both at home and in the Diaspora.

Ikeji is a four-day festival of propitiation, thanksgiving and feasting which is held annually in March or April. Reckoned with the Igbo calendar, these four days correspond to one Igbo week of four market days (Eke, Oye/Orie, Afo and Nkwo). Each of these days has a special significance and represents one of the several dimensions of Ikeji – a festival renowned for sumptuous feasting, fascinating masquerades, pulsating rhythms, and colourful performances. Traditional musical instruments used to accompany the masquerades are ekwe (wooden slit drum) of various sizes, ogene (metal gong), bells, maracas and oja (wooden flutes). The flutist is a very important element in the ikeji festival. He deftly communicates with the masquerades - weaving soulful melodies and blending esoteric messages into the intoxicating rhythm of the drums. Another interesting aspect of ikeji is the raconteur known as ima mbem - an imaginative tale delivered with a musical cadence that only the initiated can sometimes understand or comprehend. The importance of the flutist during Ikeji festival is very vital, for he communicates things hidden from the ordinary eyes to the masquerades, combined with soulful melodies, steps and gestures, “blending esoteric messages into the intoxicating rhythm of the drums” to the admiration of the crowd.

During Ikeji festival, on the last day, a ram is usually tied to a pole at  a popular market square  with a single thread. Somebody with the strongest protection from any juju of whatever type is expected to leisurely walk to the ram amids heavy attempt with juju from other people to knock him down, maim him or kill him. Only the brave can participate in, while the not so brave will either abstain from or remain with the crowd as spectators. Only the brave can stand forward from the crowd, one after another and approach the tree with a view to untying the ram. However, each contender will be attacked by forces which are beyond the scope of this article to explain, with a view to stopping him reaching the ram. If overwhelmed, he will beat a retreat back to his starting point. Until eventually, the bravest among the masquerades participating in the competition for that year's festival, after overcoming all odds, will reach the ram and untie it and take it, to a thunderous applause by the spectators. This will be followed by visits to his house by fellow kinsmen with food and wine for elevating the status of his village. 
Each year this is used to commemorate the person in Arondizuogu and neighbouring towns with the strongest juju or voodoo power of which Pericoma Okoye won several of these contests.

Arondizuogu Patriotic Union
Arondizuogu Patriotic Union (APU) is the umbrella organisation of all Arondizuogu communities in Nigeria and the Diaspora. Established in 1932 in Aba, APU is one of the earliest and most enduring organs of community development set up by an Igbo clan in colonial Nigeria. The youngmen of Arondizuogu who laid the foundation for APU left their homes for the first time in the 1920s and early 1930s to seek a better life in the emerging urban centres of colonial Nigeria.  They found themselves in social, economic and political environments different from the life they knew at home.  Refusing to be intimated or alienated, they held on to that deep feeling of love for the community with which they grew up. They assembled at Aba on October 8, 1932, to aggregate ideas on how best to convey the concomitants of modern development with which they were surrounded in the city (such as wide roads, schools, hospitals, post offices, portable water, electricity, court rooms, etc.)to their village community.

References 

https://web.archive.org/web/20060429055818/http://frasouzu.com/Seminar%20Papers/Ambience.htm cf. Asouzu, Innocent I. (2004), The Method and Principles of Complementary in and beyond African Philosophy, Calabar University Press; Asouzu, Innocent I. (2005), The Method and Principles of Complementary Reflection in and beyond African Philosophy, Lit Publishers, Münster, 2005.

Okoronkwo Chikezie (2005)"Footsteps of the elephant:A dossier on Arodizuogu" Janefred publications Owerri, Nigeria
Okoronkwo Chikezie (2016)"The Aro people of Arondizuogu" Centre Publishers Lagos, Nigeria
Uche Ohia (2007), Patriotism and Community Development: A History of Arondizuogu Patriotic Union (APU), Silverduck Services Ltd, Aba, Owerri, Abuja
 Mazi Obi Okoli (2011) The Lost Igbo Treasure, London UK: Arondizuogu Patriotic Union UK book
 Comrade V.I.Nwafor (AKA) Attorney, Nwa Ndiawa, based in South Africa. 'CEO of Attorney Solution & Proxy Pty - South Africa' 
(The Political Attorney) former secretary of (UBA- South Africa Chapter) the United Brothers of Arondizuogu - South Africa.(The son of Late Chief Boniface O. Nwafor),   (AKA)Mazi Bob.

Aros
Towns in Imo State